Lahontan cutthroat trout (Oncorhynchus clarkii henshawi) is the largest subspecies of cutthroat trout, and the state fish of Nevada. It is one of three subspecies of cutthroat trout that are listed as federally threatened.

Natural history

The Lahontan cutthroat is native to the drainages of the Truckee River, Humboldt River, Carson River, Walker River, Quinn River and several smaller rivers in the Great Basin of North America. These were tributaries of ancient and massive Lake Lahontan during the ice ages until the lake shrank to remnants such as Pyramid Lake and Walker Lake about 7,000 years ago, although Lake Tahoe—from which the Truckee flows to Pyramid Lake—is still a large mountain lake. In this sense, Lahontan cutthroats essentially evolved in inland ocean-like conditions.

The trout was able to remain a predator in the larger remnant lakes where prey fish continued to flourish, but upstream populations were forced to adapt to eating smaller fish and insects. Some experts consider O. c. henshawi in the upper Humboldt River and tributaries to be a separate subspecies, O. clarkii humboldtensis or the Humboldt cutthroat trout, adapted to living in small streams rather than large lakes.

The record size cutthroat trout of any subspecies was a Lahontan caught in Pyramid Lake weighing , although anecdotal and photographic evidence exists of even larger fish from this lake.

Human history
The Lahontan cutthroats of Pyramid and Walker Lakes were of considerable importance to the Paiute tribe. These trout, as well as cui-ui, a sucker found only in Pyramid Lake, were dietary mainstays and were used by other tribes in the area.

When John C. Frémont and Kit Carson ascended the Truckee River on January 16, 1844, they called it the 'Salmon Trout River', after the huge Lahontan cutthroat trout that ran up the river from Pyramid Lake to spawn.

American settlement in the Great Basin nearly extirpated this species. During the 19th and early 20th centuries, Lahontan cutthroats were caught in tremendous numbers and shipped to towns and mining camps throughout the West; estimates have ranged as high as  annually between 1860 and 1920. A dam in Mason Valley blocked spawning runs from Walker Lake. By 1905, Derby Dam on the Truckee River below Reno interfered with Pyramid Lake's spawning runs. A poorly designed fish ladder washed away in 1907, then badly timed water diversions to farms in the Fallon, Nevada area stranded spawning fish and desiccated eggs below the dam. By 1943, Pyramid Lake's population was extinct. Lake Tahoe's population was extinct by 1930 from competition and inbreeding with introduced rainbow trout (creating cutbows), predation by introduced lake trout, and diseases introduced along with these exotic species.

Upstream populations have been isolated and decimated by poorly managed grazing and excessive water withdrawals for irrigation, as well as by hybridization, competition, and predation by non-native salmonids. This is important, as although Lahontan cutthroat trout can inhabit either lakes or streams, they are obligatory stream spawners.

Pyramid Lake and Truckee River water quality
Pyramid Lake, the second-largest natural lake in the Western United States—prior to construction of the Derby Dam, which diverted water from the lake—has been the focus of several water quality investigations, the most detailed starting in the mid-1980s. Under direction of the U.S. Environmental Protection Agency a comprehensive dynamic hydrology transport model, the Dynamic Stream Simulation and Assessment Model (DSSAM), was applied to analyze impacts of a variety of land use and wastewater management decisions throughout the  Truckee River Basin. These analyses allowed more competent decisions to be made regarding the watersheds, as well as management of treated effluent discharged to the Truckee River.

Conservation
Lahontan cutthroat trout currently occupy a small fraction of their historic range. The primary obstacle to their recovery is non-native salmonid predation by brook trout (Salvelinus fontinalis) on fluvial cutthroat and lake trout (Salvelinus namaycush) on lacustrine cutthroat. Also, hybridization of cutthroat with non-native rainbow trout (Oncorhynchus mykiss) continues to threaten recovery of the pure Lahontan cutthroat. In the Truckee River system, only Independence Lake has continuously harbored its historic native Lahontan cutthroat population, although precariously low spawner numbers there have recently increased along with five years of brook trout removal.

Pyramid and Walker Lakes have been restocked with fish captured in Summit Lake (Nevada) and Lake Heenan, and those populations are maintained by fish hatcheries. Unfortunately, the Summit Lake strain does not live as long or grow as large as the original strain of fish. However, in the 1970s, fish believed to have been stocked almost a century ago from the Pyramid Lake strain were discovered in a small stream along the Pilot Peak area of western Utah border, and are a genetic match to the original strain. This Pilot Peak strain is now integral to the reintroduction and planting programs maintained by the U.S. Fish and Wildlife Service. Another strain of the subspecies from Independence Lake is available, and a broodstock managed by the California Department of Fish and Wildlife at their hatchery on Hot Creek, though less is known on the suitability of Independence Lake fish to other systems.

Preservation of highly complementary habitats is crucial for the survival of the different age classes of cutthroat trout, with clean gravels needed for spawning, slow-moving side channel habitats used by juvenile fish, and deeper pool habitats such as beaver ponds for larger adult fish.

They were classified as an endangered species between 1970 and 1975, then the classification was changed to threatened species in 1975, and reaffirmed as threatened in 2008.

Although Lahontan cutthroat trout stand little chance of surviving for long in Lake Tahoe, the Nevada Department of Wildlife (NDOW) planted them instead of rainbow trout on the lake's Nevada shore in summer 2011. The goal is to enable anglers to catch Lake Tahoe's native trout for the first time since 1939. The California state record was caught in Lake Tahoe in 1911 by William Pomin, weighing , .

Because it tolerates water too alkaline for other trout, Lahontan cutthroats are stocked in alkaline lakes outside its native range, including Lake Lenore (alternately Lenore Lake), Grimes Lake and Omak Lake in central Washington and Mann Lake in Oregon's Alvord Desert east of Steens Mountain.

References

Further reading

External links
 Lahontan cutthroat trout at U.S. Fish and Wildlife 
 Lahontan cutthroat trout at California Department of Fish and Game 
 Nate Schweber, "Lahontan Cutthroat Trout Make a Comeback", New York Times, April 24, 2013 (20- and 25-pound trout caught and released; review of recovery efforts)

Cold water fish
Lahontan cutthroat trout
ESA threatened species
Fauna of the Great Basin
Trout, Lahontan
Lahontan cutthroat trout
Fish of the Western United States
Freshwater fish of the United States
Lahontan cutthroat trout
Subspecies
Symbols of Nevada
Taxa named by David Starr Jordan